Andrej Wiebauer is a Slovak sprint canoer who competed in the mid-2000s. He won a silver medal in the K-4 500 m at the 2005 ICF Canoe Sprint World Championships in Zagreb.

References

Living people
Slovak male canoeists
Year of birth missing (living people)
ICF Canoe Sprint World Championships medalists in kayak